Slovenia is set to participate in the Eurovision Song Contest 2023 in Liverpool, United Kingdom, having internally selected Joker Out to represent the country with the song "", which was written by the band's lead singer . Joker Out were announced as the Slovenian entrants to the contest on 8 December 2022, whilst their song was presented to the public in a televised presentation show, on 4 February 2023.

Background 

The country's only other top ten result was achieved in  when Tanja Ribič performing "" placed tenth. Since the introduction of semi-finals to the format of the contest in 2004, Slovenia had thus far only managed to qualify to the final on six occasions. In , "" performed by LPS failed to qualify to the final, finishing in last place in the first semi-final with 15 points. This marked Slovenia's worst result at the contest in ten years.

The Slovenian national broadcaster, broadcasts the event within Slovenia and organises the selection process for the nation's entry. Following the poor result in 2022, RTVSLO considered withdrawing from the Eurovision Song Contest in 2023. However, after discussions with the Music Commission of the Programme Council, the broadcaster opted against a withdrawal, and confirmed its participation in the 2023 contest, to be held in Liverpool, on 15 September 2022. The Slovenian entry for the Eurovision Song Contest has usually been selected through a national final entitled  (EMA), which has been produced with variable formats, with the exceptions of 2013 and 2021 when the Slovenian entry was internally selected. Despite initially confirming that EMA would be used to select the Slovenian entry for the 2023 contest, the broadcaster later opted to forego the use of the national final in order to internally select the Slovenian entry.

Before Eurovision

Internal selection 
On 8 December 2022, the broadcaster announced that they had selected the band Joker Out to represent Slovenia in Liverpool. The Slovenian song was recorded in December 2022 in Hamburg, Germany. The band worked with Mark Pirc,  and Todd Burke during the recording process, with Pirc also acting as the creative director for the entry's music video, which was completed in January 2023. 

The selected song, "", was presented to the public on 4 February 2023, during the special presentation show . Konstrakta, who represented Serbia in the Eurovision Song Contest 2022, also performed live. The band also released the music video for the song, which was shot in Ljubljana at the Grand Hotel Union and directed by Bonino Englaro.

Promotion 
In order to promote "" as the Slovenian entry for the 2023 contest, Joker Out will embark on a promotional tour across Europe and Slovenia. The band were the first to be confirmed as attending the Barcelona Eurovision Party on 8 April 2023. The band will also appear at pre-parties in Madrid, London, Warsaw and Amsterdam. On 9 March, the band revealed that they were recording an English language version of "", after approaching fans on Instagram.

At Eurovision 
According to Eurovision rules, all nations with the exceptions of the host country and the "Big Five" (France, Germany, Italy, Spain and the United Kingdom) are required to qualify from one of two semi-finals in order to compete for the final; the top ten countries from each semi-final progress to the final. The European Broadcasting Union (EBU) split up the competing countries into six different pots based on voting patterns from previous contests, with countries with favourable voting histories put into the same pot. On 31 January 2023, an allocation draw was held, which placed each country into one of the two semi-finals, and determined which half of the show they would perform in. Slovenia has been placed into the second semi-final, to be held on 11 May 2023, and has been scheduled to perform in the second half of the show.

References 

2023
Countries in the Eurovision Song Contest 2023
Eurovision